Białek is a Polish-language surname. Archaic feminine forms: Białkówna (maiden name), Białkowa  (name by husband). Notable people with this surname include:
, Polish female handballer
Bartosz Białek
Janusz Białek
Jarosław Białek
William Bialek

Polish-language surnames